The Kent Showground, formerly (and still colloquially) known as the Kent County Showground is an area of land in Detling, Kent, England, north of the county town of Maidstone. Stretching along the north side of the A249 from the top of Detling Hill on land that formerly comprised RAF Detling, it is home to the Kent County Agricultural Society which hosts the venue's best-known event, the Kent County Show, each July. However the venue also hosts many other fairs, conferences and events throughout the year.

External links

Buildings and structures in Kent
Exhibition and conference centres in England
Showgrounds in England